Alexander Mühling (born 5 September 1992) is a German professional footballer who plays as a midfielder for  club Holstein Kiel. He was born Alexander Bieler but decided to adopt his wife's surname, Mühling, in the summer of 2017.

He was a youth international for Germany, earning three caps for the under-18 team in 2010.

References

Living people
1992 births
Sportspeople from Oberhausen
German footballers
Footballers from North Rhine-Westphalia
Germany youth international footballers
2. Bundesliga players
3. Liga players
Regionalliga players
Borussia Mönchengladbach II players
Bayer 04 Leverkusen II players
Bayer 04 Leverkusen players
SV Sandhausen players
Holstein Kiel players
Association football midfielders